Kalajdžić is a Serbo-Croatian surname, derived from the occupation kalajdžija (tinker). Notable people with the surname include:

Avdo Kalajdžić (born 1959), former Bosnian professional footballer
Muhamed Bekir Kalajdžić (1892–1963), Bosnian writer, bookseller and publisher
Radivoje Kalajdzic (born 1991), Bosnian-American professional boxer
Sasa Kalajdzic (born 1997), Austrian professional footballer
Željko Kalajdžić (born 1978),  Serbian professional football coach and former player

Bosnian surnames
Serbian surnames
Occupational surnames